, provisional designation , is an inclined Neptune trojan that shares Neptune's orbit in the  Lagrangian point. It was discovered on 4 November 2007, by astronomers Andrew Becker, Andrew Puckett and Jeremy Kubica at the Apache Point Observatory in New Mexico, United States, although images from 2005 have also been recovered. It measures approximately 160 kilometers in diameter and was the sixth Neptune trojan to be discovered. , it is 34.1 AU from Neptune.

Orbit and classification 

Neptune trojans can be considered resonant trans-Neptunian objects in a 1:1 mean-motion orbital resonance with Neptune. These trojans have a semi-major axis and an orbital period very similar to Neptune's (30.10 AU; 164.8 years).

 belongs to the leading  group, which orbits 60° ahead of Neptune's orbit. It orbits the Sun with a semi-major axis of 29.926 AU at a distance of 28.1–31.7 AU once every 163 years and 9 months (59,795 days). Its orbit has an eccentricity of 0.06 and an inclination of 28° with respect to the ecliptic.

Physical characteristics

Diameter 

The discoverers estimate that  has a mean-diameter of 160 kilometers based on a magnitude of 22.2. Based on a generic magnitude-to-diameter conversion, it measures approximately 110 kilometers in diameter using an absolute magnitude of 7.9 with an assumed albedo of 0.10.

Numbering and naming 

This minor planet was numbered by the Minor Planet Center on 18 May 2019. As of 2019, it has not been named. If named, it will follow the naming scheme already established with 385571 Otrera and 385695 Clete, which is to name these objects after figures related to the Amazons, an all-female warrior tribe that fought in the Trojan War on the side of the Trojans against the Greek.

References

External links 
 MPEC 2008-E44 : 2007 VL305
 AstDys-2 about 
 
 

527604
Discoveries by Andrew C. Becker
Discoveries by Andrew W. Puckett
Discoveries by Jeremy Martin Kubica
20071104